Phoenix Park may refer to:

Parks
Phoenix Park in Dublin, Ireland
Phoenix Park, Runcorn, Cheshire, England
Phoenix Park, Thurnscoe, South Yorkshire, England
Phoenix Civic Space Park, Phoenix, Arizona, United States
Phoenix Park (Eau Claire, Wisconsin), United States

Other uses
Phoenix Park F.C., former English football club based in Bradford, West Yorkshire
Phoenix Trotting Park, former horse racing track in Goodyear, Arizona, United States
Phoenix Park Racecourse, racecourse in Dublin adjacent to Phoenix Park
Phoenix Park tram stop, stop on Nottingham Express Transit, Bulwell, Nottingham, England

See also
Phoenix Park Murders